Ambwene Simukonda (born 23 March 1984 in Blantyre) is a Malawian sprinter who specializes in the 400 metres. She represented Malawi at the 2012 Summer Olympics where she became the quickest ever Malawian 400m female runner (54.20).

References 

1984 births
Living people
People from Blantyre
Malawian female sprinters
Athletes (track and field) at the 2012 Summer Olympics
Olympic athletes of Malawi
Olympic female sprinters
Members of Thames Valley Harriers